Trikorfo is a former community in Messenia, Peloponnese, Greece. Since the 2011 local government reform it is part of the municipality Messini, of which it is a municipal unit. The municipal unit has an area of 42.938 km2. Population 706 (2011). The average altitude of Trikorfo village is 398 meters. It is famous place because of the extra quality of olives. The seat of the community was Trikorfo. Predominantly a farming region, the principal exports include kalamata olives, olive oil and figs. The community was divided into Trikorfo, Mavros Logkos, Chilia Spitia, Draina Klima, Koromilea, Palaiokastro, Kinigos. Trikorfo village is also known as Pentias.
Common family names in Trikorfo include Skoufis and Katsipodas.

References

Populated places in Messenia